Elkhorn Lake is a lake in Kandiyohi County, in the U.S. state of Minnesota.

Elkhorn Lake was named for a large set of antlers found near the lake in the 1850s.

See also
List of lakes in Minnesota

References

Lakes of Minnesota
Lakes of Kandiyohi County, Minnesota